Ivan Višak is a Grand Prix motorcycle racer from Croatia. He currently competes in the European Superstock 600 Championship aboard a Kawasaki ZX-6R and in the Alpe Adria Road Racing Superstock 600 Championship aboard a Yamaha YZF-R6.

In 2009 Višak became the first Croat at a Grand Prix motorcycle race, competing on a wild card.

In December 2012 Višak placed third in the final of the Red Bull Kart Fight, the world's largest amateur kart racing competition, In his second Red Bull Kart Fight final in 2014, Višak again placed third.

Career statistics

By season

Races by year

References

External links
 Profile on motogp.com
 INTERVJU: Ivan Višak, pobjednik prvog hrvatskog RedBull kart fighta 

Croatian motorcycle racers
Living people
1993 births
125cc World Championship riders